is a Japanese professional wrestler currently working for the Japanese professional wrestling promotion World Wonder Ring Stardom where she is a former Artist of Stardom Champion.

Professional wrestling career

Independent circuit (2011-present)
Kashima worked a couple of matches for Tokyo Gurentai, one of them being at Tokyo Love II ~Another Chance~ from September 28, 2011, where she fell short to Io Shirai and Nanae Takahashi in a triple threat match. The other one took place eight years later, at Tokyo Gurentai Lucha Libre Fiesta, an event produced by Stardom in partnership with Tokyo Gurentai, where she participated in a four-way tag team elimination match, teaming up with Starlight Kid and Tam Nakano as STARS and going against Oedo Tai (Andras Miyagi, Hazuki and Kagetsu), JAN (Jungle Kyona, Natsuko Tora and Saya Iida), and Queen's Quest (AZM, Momo Watanabe and Utami Hayashishita).

World Wonder Ring Stardom (2011-2013)

Kashima made her professional wrestling debut at World Wonder Ring Stardom's Stardom Season 2: Grow Up Stars show from June 12, 2011, where she fought Natsuki Taiyo in a three-minute exhibition match time-limit draw. At Stardom Season 10 New Year Stars 2013 on January 14, she teamed up with Act Yasukawa and Natsuki Taiyo and defeated Kellie Skater, Portia Perez and Tomoka Nakagawa to become the inaugural Artist of Stardom Champions. This would be her last match before a five-year hiatus from in-ring activity.

2018-present
A notable confrontation in which she was involved was at Stardom X Stardom 2018: Kagetsu 10th Anniversary Show from August 12, where she unsuccessfully challenged Momo Watanabe for the Wonder of Stardom Championship. At the Goddesses Of Stardom Tag League 2018 tournament, Kashima teamed up with Mayu Iwatani, placing themselves in the Block A and scoring a total of seven points after going against Leo Onozaki and Hanan, Momo Watanabe and Utami Hayashishita, Hana Kimura and Mary Apache, JAN (Kaori Yoneyama and Ruaka), and their fellow Stars stablemates Starlight Kid and Natsumi. At Stardom New Years Stars 2019 on January 3, she participated in a 24-woman battle royal, competing against notable opponents such as Hana Kimura, Kagetsu, Natsu Sumire and Viper. She participated in the Goddesses Of Stardom Tag League 2019, teaming up with former STARS stablemate Mayu Iwatani, placing themselves in the Red Block, and scoring a total of two points after going against the teams of Queen's Quest (AZM and Momo Watanabe), Riho and Starlight Kid, Tokyo Cyber Squad (Jungle Kyona and Konami, Bea Priestley and Jamie Hayter, and Oedo Tai (Hazuki and Natsuko Tora). At Stardom Yokohama Cinderella on October 3, 2020, Kashima teamed up with Natsuko Tora and defeated Jungle Kyona and Konami in a Losing Unit Must Disband no disqualification match, forcing them to dissolve the Tokyo Cyber Squad stable. She participated in the 2020 edition of the Goddesses of Stardom Tag League, teaming up with Natsuko Tora under Oedo Tai's sub-group named Devil Duo, placing themselves in the Red Block and scoring a total of four points.

At the 10th Anniversary of Stardom on March 3, 2021, Kashima teamed up with Natsuko Tora to unsuccessfully challenge Donna Del Mondo (Maika and Himeka) for the Goddess of Stardom Championship. The next notable show where she took place was Stardom Yokohama Dream Cinderella 2021 from April 4, where she teamed up with fellow Oedo Tai stablemates Natsuko Tora, Ruaka, Konami and Rina to defeat STARS (Mayu Iwatani, Saya Iida, Starlight Kid, Hanan and Gokigen Death) in a Ten-woman elimination tag team match in which she made two eliminations and secured the victory, therefore forcing Gokigen Death to join Oedo Tai since the last one eliminated was forced to join the enemy unit. She was scheduled to face AZM in the first night of the Stardom Cinderella Tournament 2021 on April 10, but she was replaced by Rina. At Yokohama Dream Cinderella 2021 in Summer on July 4, Kashima teamed up with Rina and fell short to Konami and Fukigen Death, Maika and Lady C, and Hanan and Hina as a result of a gauntlet tag team match. At Stardom 5 Star Grand Prix 2021 she fought in the "Red Stars" block where she scored a total of four points after competing against Momo Watanabe, Mayu Iwatani, Koguma, Starlight Kid, Himeka, Fukigen Death, Natsupoi, Giulia and Mina Shirakawa. At Stardom 10th Anniversary Grand Final Osaka Dream Cinderella on October 9, 2021, she unsuccessfiully challenged Syuri for the SWA World Championship. At Tokyo Super Wars, the second event of the Stardom Super Wars trilogy which took place on November 27, 2021, Kashima teamed up with Fukigen Death and Rina in a losing effort against	Stars (Mayu Iwatani, Hazuki and Hanan). At Osaka Super Wars on December 18, she teamed up with Konami and Ruaka and Starlight Kid to defeat Queen's Quest (Momo Watanabe, AZM, Saya Kamitani and Utami Hayashishita) after Watanabe betrayed her unit during match and joined Oedo Tai. At Stardom Dream Queendom on December 29, 2021, Kashima competed in a five-way match won by Fugiken Death and also involving Lady C, Waka Tsukiyama and Rina.

At Stardom Nagoya Supreme Fight, Kashima competed in another five-way match, teaming up with her stablemates Ruaka, Rina and Fukigen Death, getting defeated by Momo Kohgo. At Stardom Cinderella Journey on February 23, 2022, Kashima teamed up with Fukigen Death o unsuccessfully challenge 	FWC (Hazuki and Koguma) for the Goddess of Stardom Championship. On the first night of the Stardom World Climax 2022 from March 26, she teamed up with Fukigen Death and Ruaka and competed in a gauntlet match won by Himeka, Natsupoi, and Mai Sakurai, and also involving the teames of AZM, Lady C and Miyu Amasakim an Cosmic Angels (Waka Tsukiyama, Mina Shirakawa) and Momo Kohgo. On the second night from March 27, she competed in an 18-women Cinderella Rumble match won by Mei Suruga and also involving several competitors from out of Stardom such as Tomoka Inaba, Aoi, Haruka Umesaki and Maria. At Stardom Cinderella Tournament 2022, Kashima made it to the quarterfinals where she got defeated by Mirai on April 17. At Stardom Golden Week Fight Tour on May 5, 2022, she teamed up with Ruaka and Rina and fell short to Stars (Hanan, Saya Iida and Momo Kohgo). At Stardom Flashing Champions on May 28, 2022, Kashima alongside Starlight Kid and Momo Watanabe defeated MiHimePoi (Maika, Himeka and Natsupoi) to win the Artist of Stardom Championship. At Stardom Fight in the Top, Kashima, Kid and Watanabe defended the artist titles against God's Eye (Syuri, Ami Sourei and Mirai), and Donna Del Mondo (Giulia, Maika and Mai Sakurai). At Mid Summer Champions in Tokyo, the first event of the Stardom Mid Summer Champions which took place on July 9, 2022, Kashima alongside Ruaka, Rina and Fukige Death defeated Stars (Mayu Iwatani, Hazuki, Koguma and Saya Iida). At Mid Summer Champions in Osaka on July 24, she, Kid and Watanabe defended the artist titles against Giulia, Maika and Himeka. At Stardom in Showcase vol.1 on July 23, 2022, Kashima competed in a Nagoya rumble match. At Stardom 5 Star Grand Prix 2022, she fought in the "Red Stars" block where she scored a total of twelve points after going against Tam Nakano, Himeka, Syuri, AZM, Maika, Risa Sera, Utami Hayashishita, Koguma, Saki, Mai Sakurai, Momo Kohgo and Unagi Sayaka. At Stardom x Stardom: Nagoya Midsummer Encounter on August 21, 2022, she alongside Kid and Waanabe defended the artist titles against Cosmic Angels (Mina Shirakawa, Unagi Sayaka and Saki).

Championships and accomplishments
World Wonder Ring Stardom
Artist of Stardom Championship (5 times, inaugural) – with Act Yasukawa and Natsuki Taiyo (1), Mayu Iwatani and Tam Nakano (2), Bea Priestley and Natsuko Tora (1), Momo Watanabe and Starlight Kid (1)
Goddess of Stardom Championship (1 time) – with Mayu Iwatani
Stardom Year-End Award (1 time)
Best Unit Award (2021) 
5★Star GP Award (1 times)
 5★Star GP Outstanding Performance Award (2022)

References 

1993 births
Living people
Japanese female professional wrestlers
21st-century professional wrestlers
Goddess of Stardom Champions
Artist of Stardom Champions